Spirit is the fourteenth studio album by English electronic music band Depeche Mode, released on 17 March 2017 by Columbia Records and Mute Records. The album was recorded with new producer James Ford, and was preceded by the single "Where's the Revolution". It was the final Depeche Mode studio album to feature co-founder and keyboardist Andy Fletcher before his death on 26 May 2022.

Background and composition
Much of the inspiration behind Spirit arose from their distaste for the political climate in both the United States and the United Kingdom. In an interview with Vevo, Dave Gahan stated, "We're really kind of upset about what's going on in the world." In the same interview, when hearing of being praised by alt-right activist Richard Spencer, Gahan rejected the praise and did not want to be associated with him or the alt-right. Depeche Mode would embrace their political message heavily in the music video for "Where's the Revolution", which represents the band in a very Marxist style. One of the themes that appears is climate change as Martin confirmed: "'The Worst Crime' is about destroying the environment. We are not just destroying it for those of us who live in the present. We are condemning the planet and the next generations, our children and our grandchildren." Gore confirmed that the opening track "Going Backwards" is about the regression of society as well as technology's role in the regression, but Gore also believed "that new technologies would bring the world together – the world would be united by them. We were all enthusiastic about the Arab Spring, when people started organizing themselves with social media and fought for their freedom. But then everything went wrong: the Middle East seems to be falling apart". One of the major differences about the delivery on Spirit compared to past albums is how direct and straightforward some of the lyrics are. Gahan told Billboard, "There are songs that are quite literal on the album. 'Scum' for instance, it was a lot of fun recording that song and singing it." Perhaps the closing track "Fail" is one of the band's most direct and angry songs as it is the first time they used profanity in their music. When asked about why "Fail" was chosen to be the closing track, Gore explained that it "sums up the album in a way. The good thing about it is the lyrics might be depressing but the music is so pretty". When the band was deciding on the tracklist, Gahan wanted to end the album on a happy note with "So Much Love", but was ultimately outvoted by the other members.

Depeche Mode does not only tackle political subject matter on Spirit. The track "Poison Heart" is written like a breakup song, but Gahan explained that it is not a breakup song and is about the inability to relate to other people. Gore wrote the track "Eternal" for his younger daughter and, despite its dark tone and dramatic composition, Gore believes that "it's my way of romance. I think that when you put a child into this era, you have to take the worst into account".

Gahan revealed that Gore had many instrumentals left over from his solo album MG (2015). One of those instrumentals was later developed into the track "You Move". "You Move" was also the first time Gore and Gahan wrote a song together. Some of the tracks ended up with a very cinematic composition such as "Cover Me". According to an interview with keyboard programmer Matrixxman, working on "Cover Me" was initially difficult, but Gahan inspired everyone to get very creative on that track. In the same interview, Matrixxman confirmed that there were several tracks that didn't make it onto the album but they never made it past the demo stage. It was also his first time working with modular synthesizers. Compared to 2013's Delta Machine, Spirit is in many ways more electronic-oriented compared to the blues-inspired sound on the previous album, but the track "Poorman" still sees the band explore their blues influences.

Promotion
On 11 October 2016, the band announced that they would embark on the Global Spirit Tour to support the album. The tour began in Stockholm, Sweden, on 5 May 2017 and ended on 25 July 2018 in Berlin, Germany. The Global Spirit Tour went on to become the band's largest tour, and saw the band play to more than 3 million fans around the world. The final two shows of the Global Spirit Tour were recorded for their concert film and documentary Spirits in the Forest, released in theaters in November 2019. The full concert film later received a home release on 26 June 2020.

Reception

Spirit received generally positive reviews from critics upon release. At Metacritic, which assigns a normalised rating out of 100 to reviews from mainstream publications, the album received an average score of 74, based on 24 reviews. Neil Z. Yeung of AllMusic stated, "Robust and fearless, Spirit may end up being one of the earliest and best salvos of its political era. Despite dour lyrics to the contrary, Depeche Mode haven't given up on humanity". Saby Reyes-Kulkarni of Pitchfork wrote that "Spirit is so convincing in spite of its radical shift in tenor. For both the band and audience, that shift couldn't have come at a better time". Kitty Empire of The Guardian stated that "By the time cosseted arena bands reach their 37th year, their need to engage with the real world is moot, but here's Martin Gore – DepMo's chief songwriter – lambasting greedy corporations". Various critics have cited the album's conscious lyrics and bleak instrumentals as a positive aspect.

In contrast to the generally positive reviews, Andy Gill of The Independent criticized the album, stating that "Depeche Mode get serious and political, which doesn't really suit them." While many critics praised the band's ability to tackle political and social commentary, a significant number were left unsatisfied. Despite mixed reception from some critics, Spirit still appeared on many end-of-year 2017 lists such as those from Q Magazine and AllMusic.

On many review aggregate sites, Spirit received mixed to positive ratings from site users. On Sputnikmusic, the user rating average is 3.2/5; on RateYourMusic, it is 2.83/5; and on Albumoftheyear, the user score is at 65/100. It is notable that the average user scores are slightly lower than the critic score, though still mixed to positive.

Accolades

Commercial performance
Spirit debuted at number five on the UK Albums Chart with 23,658 units sold in its first week, becoming the band's 17th top-10 album in the United Kingdom. The following week, it dropped out of the top 10 to number 17 with sales of 5,658 copies. The album debuted at number five on the US Billboard 200, selling 64,000 album-equivalent units (62,000 in pure album sales). Even though Spirits first week of sales wasn't as successful as Delta Machines in the United Kingdom, Spirits first week outperformed Delta Machines first week of sales in the United States by 12,000 album-equivalent units.

Track listing
All lead vocals by Dave Gahan, except where noted.

Personnel
Credits adapted from the liner notes of Spirit.

Depeche Mode
 Andy Fletcher
 Dave Gahan
 Martin L. Gore

Additional musicians
 Matrixxman – programming
 Kurt Uenala – programming ; electric bass 
 James Ford – drums ; pedal steel

Technical
 James Ford – production, mixing
 Jimmy Robertson – engineering, mix engineering
 Connor Long – studio assistance
 Óscar Muñoz – studio assistance
 David Schaeman – studio assistance
 Brendan Morawski – studio assistance, mix assistance
 Brian Lucey – mastering

Artwork
 Anton Corbijn – cover, all visuals, art direction, design
 SMEL – design

Charts

Weekly charts

Year-end charts

Certifications

References

External links
 

2017 albums
Albums produced by James Ford (musician)
Columbia Records albums
Depeche Mode albums
Mute Records albums